Vicko Ševelj (born 19 September 2000)  is a Croatian professional footballer who plays as a defender for NK Radomlje in the Slovenian PrvaLiga.

Club career 
Ševelj was born in Dubrovnik, living in its suburb of Mokošica, and played youth football for several local clubs before passing a trial with HNK Hajduk Split in 2015, moving to the club's youth academy in the summer of 2016. A versatile defensive player, Ševelj advanced to the club's second-tier reserve team in 2018, where he would amass 42 caps and 1 goal in three seasons, largely playing as right back. 

In April 2021, Ševelj made his first team debut, coming in for Dino Skorup against NK Slaven Belupo in the 60th minute, after the injury of first-choice right back Darko Todorović. His contract expired that summer, however, and he moved on to the Bosnian FK Sarajevo, joining former Hajduk reserve team coach Goran Sablić.

Not finding much playing time at Sarajevo, Ševelj moved to the Russian club Akron Tolyatti on loan in early 2022, returning after two months without any official caps His subsequent loan to the Slovenian side NK Radomlje  would be more fruitful, however, as he became a first-team regular and was retained by the club, Sarajevo keeping a percentage of a potential future sale.

References

External links
 

2000 births
Living people
Sportspeople from Dubrovnik
Association football defenders
Croatian footballers
Croatia youth international footballers
HNK Hajduk Split II players
HNK Hajduk Split players
FK Sarajevo players
FC Akron Tolyatti players
NK Radomlje players
First Football League (Croatia) players
Croatian Football League players
Premier League of Bosnia and Herzegovina players
Slovenian PrvaLiga players
Croatian expatriate footballers
Expatriate footballers in Bosnia and Herzegovina
Croatian expatriate sportspeople in Bosnia and Herzegovina
Expatriate footballers in Russia
Croatian expatriate sportspeople in Russia
Expatriate footballers in Slovenia
Croatian expatriate sportspeople in Slovenia